Seiyun Hadhramaut Airport  is an airport in Seiyun, Hadhramaut, Yemen.

History
In 2016, all of Yemenia's flights passed through Bisha Domestic Airport for security checks. However, Yemenia did not have the traffic rights to transport passengers solely to/from Bisha. Until November 2017, it was the sole operating airport in Yemen, due to the air blockade on Sana'a International Airport and political turmoil in Aden International Airport.  As of September 2022, the airport's sole user, Yemenia, operates flights to Aden, Cairo, and Jeddah.

Airlines and destinations

References

Airports in Yemen